Philip Thornalley (born 5 January 1960) is an English songwriter-producer who has worked in the music industry since 1978. He is perhaps best known for co-writing (with Scott Cutler and Anne Preven) the song "Torn" (made famous by Natalie Imbruglia's cover version, which he also produced) and the UK number one hits "Mama Do" and "Boys and Girls" for Pixie Lott. He also produced The Cure's 1982 album Pornography and was later their bass player for eighteen months, producing and performing the distinctive double bass line on their 1983 single "The Love Cats". In 1988, Thornalley released his only solo album Swamp and briefly joined the band Johnny Hates Jazz. He then worked principally as a songwriter for hire for many acts including Bryan Adams. In 2017 he joined Adams' band as bass player for 18 months before releasing two solo albums of his own seventies inspired music under the moniker Astral Drive.

Biography
Thornalley was born in Worlington, near Mildenhall, Suffolk, England.

He began working as a recording engineer in 1978, at RAK Studios in St. John's Wood, London for producers Mickie Most, Steve Lillywhite and Alex Sadkin.

Thornalley became the producer for The Cure on their fourth album, Pornography. After Simon Gallup parted ways with the band in 1982, he was The Cure's bassist for eighteen months. He produced their 1983 single The Love Cats and their first live album, Concert. However, he quit to resume working as a songwriter and producer.

He was nominated for a Grammy Award for Best Engineered Album, Non-Classical in 1984 for Into the Gap by the Thompson Twins and released his only solo album (Swamp). in 1988.

Thornalley has worked primarily as songwriter and record producer for other artists.  In 1991, he co-wrote Torn (with Scott Cutler and Anne Preven), which later appeared on Ednaswap's 1995 debut album. Subsequently, he was asked to produce some songs for Natalie Imbruglia, and "Torn" was re-recorded alongside four other songs Thornalley wrote on Imbruglia's 1997 seven million selling debut album Left of the Middle, and became a worldwide hit single. In 2012, the single was covered by One Direction on their live concert DVD Up All Night: The Live Tour.

Other artists Thornalley has worked with as a songwriter include Bryan Adams, BBMak, Eliza Doolittle, Melanie C, Stephanie Kirkham and Pixie Lott.

Artists Thornalley has produced, recorded or mixed include Duran Duran, Junior Giscombe, Thompson Twins, XTC, Sting, Edwyn Collins, Kiki Dee, Kim Wilde, Prefab Sprout, Hot Chocolate, Racey, Chris Spedding, Kasim Sulton, Robbie Nevil, The Frank and Walters, Ash, Julian Cope, Dionne Bromfield, Blur, Katrina and the Waves, Kate Earl, The Waterboys, Psychedelic Furs, Wax, Cyndi Lauper, Lulu, Seona Dancing and Clint Eastwood & General Saint.

In 2010, he wrote two UK number ones: Mama Do and Boys and Girls for Pixie Lott, and in 2012 the top ten hit "Kiss the Stars".

In 2016 and 2017, Thornalley toured as bass player with Bryan Adams on his "Get Up" and "Ultimate" tours. He played 53 shows in the US, Canada, UK, Europe, Israel and Republic of South Africa. He contributed the song "That's Rock and Roll" to the Get Up album and "The Last Night on Earth" and "Talk to Me" to the 2019 Shine a Light album.

In May 2018, Thornalley announced a new solo project called 'Astral Drive' with the release of the single Summer of '76, followed by the Love Is Real EP in January 2019 (including a cover of the Todd Rundgren song, "A Dream Goes On Forever"). The self-titled album was released in July 2018 on the Lojinx label. In summer 2019, Astral Drive released a companion album of remixes and out takes titled 'Green'. Summer 2021 saw the release of another album, again titled 'Astral Drive', including ten original songs and a cover of 'Open My Eyes' by Nazz.

The National Portrait Gallery includes his portrait by photographer Julian Anderson where he is listed as 'songwriter'.

In 2022 Bass Player Magazine listed Thornalley's upright bass performance on The Love Cats by The Cure as the 23rd best bass part of all time.

Influences
Thornalley's influences are Todd Rundgren, The Beatles and Pink Floyd. Soul and R&B singer Reggie Sears has named Thornalley as his favourite singer and credits Thornalley's 1988 release Swamp as the main driving force for wanting to be a singer and musician.

Selected work

As writer/producer
Singles
Natalie Imbruglia - "Torn" (#2 UK)
Natalie Imbruglia - "Wishing I Was There" (#15 US)
BBMak - "Back Here" (#11 USA / No. 5 UK) (writer only)
Bryan Adams - "On a Day Like Today" (#13 UK)
Ronan Keating - "The Way You Make Me Feel" (#6 UK)
Pixie Lott - "Boys and Girls" (#1 UK)
Pixie Lott - "Mama Do" (#1 UK)
Pixie Lott - "Cry Me Out" (#12 UK)
Pixie Lott - "Kiss the Stars" (#9 UK)
Hepburn - "I Quit" (#8 UK)
Shannon Noll - "Drive" (#1 Australia)
Daisy Wood-Davies -"Dream Baby Dream" - from the West End musical Dreamboats and Petticoats
Elkie Brooks - "Forgive and Forget"
Astral Drive - "Summer Of '76"

Albums
Natalie Imbruglia - Left of the Middle (#5 UK)
Bryan Adams - "Shine A Light" (co-writer "The Last Night On Earth" & "Talk To Me")
Bryan Adams - On a Day Like Today (co-writer "On a Day Like Today" & "How Do You Feel Tonight")
Bryan Adams - Room Service (co-writer "Not Romeo Not Juliet")
Bryan Adams - Bare Bones (co-writer "The Way You Make Me Feel")
Bryan Adams - Get Up (co-writer "That's Rock and Roll")
Bryan Adams - "Shine A Light" (co-writer "Talk to Me" & co-writer and producer "The Last Night on Earth")
Melanie C - Reason (writer "Do I","Positively Somewhere' and "Let's Love")
Melanie C - Northern Star (writer "Ga Ga" and "Be the One")
Astral Drive - Astral Drive (writer on all songs)
Astral Drive - Green (writer on all songs)
Astral Drive - Orange (writer on ten songs)
 Phil Thornalley - Now That I Have Your Attention (writer on all songs )

As producer only
Singles
The Cure - "The Hanging Garden"
Prefab Sprout - "When Love Breaks Down" (#25 UK)
The Cure - "The Love Cats" (#5 UK)
Holly Vallance - "Naughty Girl" (#9 UK)
Robbie Nevil - "C'est La Vie" (#2 US)
Wax - "Right Between the Eyes" (#1 Spain)

Albums
The Cure - Pornography (#2 UK)

As mixer
Ash - "Girl from Mars"
Psychedelic Furs - "Pretty in Pink" (original version)
Sting - "Spread a Little Happiness"
Duran Duran - "Is There Something I Should Know?" (#4 US/#1 UK)
Thompson Twins - "Hold Me Now"
Thompson Twins - "Doctor! Doctor!"
Thompson Twins - "In the Name of Love"
Thompson Twins - "Lies"
Cyndi Lauper - "What's Going On"
The Waterboys - "Fisherman's Blues"
Gary Breit - "Color Wheel"

Albums as recording engineer and mixer only
Psychedelic Furs - The Psychedelic Furs
Psychedelic Furs - Talk Talk Talk
John Martyn - Well Kept Secret
Duran Duran - Seven and the Ragged Tiger
Thompson Twins - Quick Step & Side Kick
Thompson Twins - Set
Thompson Twins - Into the Gap
Robbie Nevil - C'est La Vie
Graham Parker - The Real Macaw

Awards and nominations

Awards
 ASCAP 'Song of the Year' 1998 for "Torn" (Natalie Imbruglia)
 ASCAP 'Song of the Year' 2000 for "Back Here" (BBMak)

Nominations
Grammy Award 'Best Engineered Pop Album 1984' for Thompson Twins' Into the Gap

References

External links
 Official site

1960 births
Living people
The Cure members
English record producers
English rock bass guitarists
Male bass guitarists
English male singers
English new wave musicians
English songwriters
People educated at Culford School
People from Worlington, Suffolk
Lojinx artists